Alcithoe arabica, common name Arabic volute, is a species of very large sea snail, a marine gastropod mollusc in the family Volutidae, the volutes.

Distribution
This species is endemic to New Zealand.

Description

These shells are usually large, solid, fusiform, with relatively weak tubercles on the shoulder of the body whorl. The shell aperture is high with a thickened, rounded  outer lip. The external surface is yellowish-white with chestnut zig-zac markings, forming five bands on the body whorl. These zig-zag markings were thought to resemble Arabic writing, giving rise to the name of the species.

There is no operculum in A. arabica. Individuals have a large grey to brown foot, flecked with purple and orange markings.

Ecology
These sea snails live in subtidal waters on soft sediments. Alcithoe arabica are able to move quite quickly on the soft substrate. They feed on bivalves that they smother using their large foot. The rounded, thin shelled eggs of this species are laid on stones or other shells.

Subspecies
Alcithoe arabica motutaraensis Powell, 1928
Alcithoe arabica swainsoni Marwick, 1926

Gallery

References

Further reading
 Powell A W B, New Zealand Mollusca, William Collins Publishers Ltd, Auckland, New Zealand 1979 
 Bail, P., Limpus, A. 2005: A Conchological Iconography 11, The Recent Volutes of New Zealand, with a revision of the genus Alcithoe H. & A. Adams, 1853, ConchBooks, Hackenheim, Germany.
 Gordon, D. NZIB: New Zealand Inventory of Biodiversity.

External links 

 Museum of New Zealand Te Papa Tongarewa, Taxon: Alcithoe arabica (Gmelin, 1791) (Species)
 Catalogue of Life: Alcithoe arabica (Gmelin, 1791)
 New Zealand Mollusca: Alcithoe arabica (Gmelin, 1791)
 
 Massey University NZ Fauna Scanned 3D model of Alcithoe arabica
 Natural History Museum Rotterdam: Alcithoe arabica (f) swainsoni Marwick, 1926

Volutidae
Gastropods of New Zealand
Gastropods described in 1791
Taxa named by Johann Friedrich Gmelin